Birmingham Blitz may refer to:

Birmingham Blitz; the bombing of Birmingham, England during the Blitz.
Birmingham Blitz (basketball); basketball team based in Birmingham, Alabama.
Birmingham Blitz Dames; roller derby league based in Birmingham, England.